STPS may refer to:
Savonlinnan Työväen Palloseura, a football club
Standard temperature and pressure, saturated
Slide Transitions Per Second
Secretariat of Labor and Social Welfare of Mexico, (in Spanish Secretaría del Trabajo y Previsión Social)
Stl’atl’imx Tribal Police Service